Manachanallur is a state assembly constituency in Tamil Nadu, India newly formed after constituency delimitations 2008. Its State Assembly Constituency number is 144. It is included in the Tiruchirappalli parliamentary constituency. It is one of the 234 State Legislative Assembly Constituencies in Tamil Nadu, in India.

Election results

2021

2016

2011

1952

References 

Assembly constituencies of Tamil Nadu